CFBN was a Canadian radio station, broadcasting at 1280 kHz in Mississauga, Ontario. The station, owned by the Greater Toronto Airports Authority, aired a business news format branded as Canada's Business Network, as well as some travel and weather information reports for Toronto Pearson International Airport.

The station commenced operation in 1985, originally on AM 530 before switching to 1280 when Fort Erie's CJFT was assigned 530. Previously operating under the call sign CFYZ, the automated station originally broadcast flight arrival and departure schedules, traffic directions, parking information, and weather reports to those in the immediate vicinity of Toronto Pearson International Airport.

Live broadcasting began in December 2000. In 2002, the Greater Toronto Airports Authority was given approval by the CRTC to increase power. On May 31, 2005 the radio service reverted from live broadcasting to recorded airport information. On April 9, 2007, the station adopted the business format, but continued to broadcast airport traffic reports and advisories along with the business programming. Among programming heard on CFBN beginning April 2007 was syndicated American programming such as Dennis Miller and the Glenn Beck Program, which had never before been heard in Canada.

The station ceased broadcasting in November 2007. CFBN's license was revoked by the CRTC, as requested by the GTAA, on January 17, 2008.

In 2014, the frequency was reassigned to CJRU, a proposed campus community radio station at Ryerson University, (now Toronto Metropolitan University) which began broadcasting in 2016. The CFBN call sign has since been reassigned to a low-power traffic information station in St. Catharines, Ontario.

References

External links
 CFYZ Information from GTAA

Fbn
Fbn
Radio stations disestablished in 2008
Toronto Pearson International Airport
Mass media in Mississauga
Radio stations established in 1980
1980 establishments in Ontario
2008 disestablishments in Ontario
Business mass media in Canada
Business talk radio stations
FBN